Christian Selin (born 16 January 1976) is a Finnish former racing cyclist. He won the Finnish national road race title in 2001.

References

External links
 

1976 births
Living people
Finnish male cyclists
People from Lohja
Sportspeople from Uusimaa